87th Precinct is an American crime drama starring Robert Lansing, Gena Rowlands, Ron Harper, Gregory Walcott and Norman Fell, which aired on NBC on Monday evenings during the 1961–1962 television season.

Synopsis
The characters appeared in a series of novels and short stories written by Ed McBain. Lansing portrayed Detective Steve Carella, who worked in Manhattan's 87th precinct.

The 87th Precinct TV series differs from the books in that the series is explicitly set in New York.  As well, the character of Roger Havilland in the books is violent, corrupt, and thoroughly disliked by the other members of the squad; for the TV series, he was transformed into an honest and respected veteran officer.

87th Precinct premiered on September 25, 1961 and ended on September 10, 1962.

Cast
Robert Lansing as Det. Steve Carella
Norman Fell as Det. Meyer Meyer 
Gregory Walcott as Det. Roger Havilland   
Ron Harper as Det. Bert Kling

Episodes

Home media
Timeless Media Group released the complete series on DVD in Region 1 in August 2012.

References

External links 
 

1961 American television series debuts
1962 American television series endings
1960s American crime drama television series
1960s American police procedural television series
Black-and-white American television shows
English-language television shows
NBC original programming
Television shows set in New York City
Television series by Universal Television
American detective television series